North Carolina Highway 87 (NC 87) is a primary state highway in the U.S. state of North Carolina. NC 87 begins in the Atlantic coastal town of Southport and crosses into Virginia at the Virginia state line five miles (8 km) north of Eden in Rockingham County. At  in length, NC 87 is the second longest state highway in the U.S. state of North Carolina with only North Carolina Highway 24 (NC 24) being longer. Labeled as a north–south route, NC 87 travels along a relatively straight southeast–northwest path, connecting Cape Fear region with the Piedmont. It is also the main north-south route connecting the cities of Fayetteville, Sanford,  Burlington and Reidsville.

Route description
NC 87 is a four-lane, divided highway with at-grade crossings between Elizabethtown and Sanford with the exception of Fayetteville, where NC 87 is a freeway. Other sections that are four-lane, divided highways include concurrencies with US 17 and US 74/US 76 in Brunswick County.

In Sanford, it intersects US 421, on which users can travel east to Lillington, or northwest to Greensboro, and Winston-Salem.  North of Sanford, NC 87 runs concurrent with US 15/US 501 to Pittsboro. It then continues towards Graham as a two-lane highway. It returns to four-lanes in southern Graham, returning to two-lane in downtown Graham. The route makes a left turn one block north of the Alamance County Courthouse, where it follows a two-lane road before making a right turn onto a four-lane street. The highway remains four-lane through downtown Burlington, returning to mostly two lanes for the remainder of its route in North Carolina, save for Reidsville, where it intersects US 29, and runs on four-lane commercial corridor Freeway Drive.

History

North Carolina Highway 303

North Carolina Highway 303 (NC 303) was a primary state highway in the U.S. state of North Carolina. Established as an original state highway, NC 303 was routed from NC 30, in Pollocksville, west through Trenton, before ending at NC 10/NC 11, in Kinston. In 1925, all of NC 303 was renumbered as part of NC 12. In 1930, NC 303 was resurrected as a new primary routing from NC 130 (now NC 211), near Southport, to NC 30 (became US 17 in late 1934), near Winnabow. On October 23, 1952, NC 303 was renumbered as an extension of NC 87.

Major intersections

Special routes

Elizabethtown business loop

North Carolina Highway 87 Business (NC 87 Bus.), was established in 1997, when mainline NC 87 was moved south to bypass downtown Elizabethtown. NC 87 Business follows the original alignment along Broad Street.

Fayetteville alternate route 1

North Carolina Highway 87 Alternate (NC 87A), was established between 1940-44 as a new primary routing. It ran from US 15A/NC 87 (Hay Street) north along Robeson Street and then west along Fort Bragg Boulevard, recombining with mainline NC 87 on Fort Bragg Road. Sometime between 1945–49, it switched with mainline NC 87.

Fayetteville alternate route 2

North Carolina Highway 87 Alternate (NC 87A), was established between 1945–49, the second NC 87A in Fayetteville followed the original NC 87 alignment along Hay Street, Morganton Road, and Fort Bragg Road. The route was decommissioned between 1955-57.

Sanford bypass

North Carolina Highway 87 Bypass (NC 87 By-pass) was established in 2013 as a new primary route along existing sections of the Sanford Bypass (formally SR 9000), from NC 87 to US 1/US 15/US 501. The request to establish a bypass was pushed by the Sanford City Council and Lee County. Typically, the old alignment would become a business loop, but instead the NC 87 mainline remained unchanged. The bypass is built as a freeway; which shares designation with US 421.

References

External links

NCRoads.com: N.C. 87
NCRoads.com: N.C. 87-A
NCRoads.com: N.C. 87 Bus

087
Transportation in Brunswick County, North Carolina
Transportation in Columbus County, North Carolina
Transportation in Bladen County, North Carolina
Transportation in Cumberland County, North Carolina
Transportation in Harnett County, North Carolina
Transportation in Lee County, North Carolina
Transportation in Chatham County, North Carolina
Transportation in Alamance County, North Carolina
Transportation in Caswell County, North Carolina
Transportation in Rockingham County, North Carolina